Stercobilin is a tetrapyrrolic bile pigment and is one end-product of heme catabolism. It is the chemical responsible for the brown color of human feces and was originally isolated from feces in 1932. Stercobilin (and related urobilin) can be used as a marker for biochemical identification of fecal pollution levels in rivers.

Metabolism 
Stercobilin results from breakdown of the heme moiety of hemoglobin found in erythrocytes. Macrophages break down senescent erythrocytes and break the heme down into biliverdin, which rapidly reduces to free bilirubin. Bilirubin binds tightly to plasma proteins (especially albumin) in the blood stream and is transported to the liver, where it is conjugated with one or two glucuronic acid residues into bilirubin diglucuronide, and secreted into the small intestine as bile. In the small intestine, some bilirubin glucuronide is converted back to bilirubin via bacterial enzymes in the terminal ileum.  This bilirubin is further converted to colorless urobilinogen. Urobilinogen that remains in the colon can either be reduced to stercobilinogen and finally oxidized to stercobilin, or it can be directly reduced to stercobilin. Stercobilin is responsible for the brown color of human feces. Stercobilin is then excreted in the feces.

Role in disease

Obstructive jaundice
In obstructive jaundice, no bilirubin reaches the small intestine, meaning that there is no formation of stercobilinogen. The lack of stercobilin and other bile pigments causes feces to become clay-colored.

Brown pigment gallstones
An analysis of two infants suffering from cholelithiasis observed that a substantial amount of stercobilin was present in brown pigment gallstones. This study suggested that brown pigment gallstones could form spontaneously in infants suffering from bacterial infections of the biliary tract.

Role in treatment of disease 
A 1996 study by McPhee et al. suggested that stercobilin and other related pyrrolic pigments — including urobilin, biliverdin, and xanthobilirubic acid — has potential to function as a new class of HIV-1 protease inhibitors when delivered at low micromolar concentrations. These pigments were selected due to a similarity in shape to the successful HIV-1 protease inhibitor Merck L-700,417 (N,N-Bis(2-hydroxy-1-indanyl)-2,6-diphenylmethyl-4-hydroxy-1,7-heptandiamide). Further research is suggested to study the pharmacological efficacy of these pigments.

See also 
 Bile pigment
 Bilirubin
 Biliverdin
 Heme
 Urobilin

References 

Metabolism
Digestive system
Tetrapyrroles
Gamma-lactams